Cham Qaleh ( may refer to:
 Chamkhaleh, Gilan Province
 Chaf and Chamkhaleh, Gilan Province
 Cham Qaleh, Chaharmahal and Bakhtiari
 Cham Qaleh, Kuhdasht, Lorestan Province
 Cham Qaleh, Pol-e Dokhtar, Lorestan Province